Carat Cheung (born 7 December 1987) is a Canadian-Chinese actress, model and former beauty pageant winner currently based in Hong Kong and previously under Television Broadcasts Limited (TVB) management. She is the winner of Miss Hong Kong 2012.

Biography
Carat Cheung hails from Vancouver, British Columbia. She attended Killarney Secondary School and graduated from University of British Columbia majoring in Economics Business Studies. Cheung is also the niece of TVB television drama producer Alfred Cheung Kin-ting. Prior to returning to Hong Kong, Cheung worked as a presenter for Fairchild TV, a Chinese television channel in Canada.

Pageant career
Cheung was a contestant at the 2009 Miss Chinese (Vancouver) Pageant, coming in 1st Runner-Up, behind that year's winner Eliza Sam.

In 2012, Cheung returned to Hong Kong in order to participate in the 2012 Miss Hong Kong pageant for a better chance of aspiration to enter into acting. 2012 was the first Miss Hong Kong pageant to hold viewers choice online voting. The winner was to be selected based on popular online votes by audiences. Cheung was crowned the winner on August 26, 2012. However, her win remained highly controversial as TVB's computer servers were disrupted, resulting in a lot of viewers unable to vote for their favourite. At the end, the winner was decided by the judging panel. Netizens and a few TVB artistes were not happy with the final winner result and demanded TVB do a recount to be fair for all the other contestants. Cheung's uncle, Alfred Cheung, came to her defense noting all past winners were decided by the judges so the rightful winner was crowned.

After winning the 2012 Miss Hong Kong title, Cheung went on to participate in the Miss Chinese International Pageant 2013, where she finished as 2nd Runner-Up.

Acting career
Cheung's acting debuted in 2014 with a minor role in TVB drama Tomorrow Is Another Day. The following year, she was cast in supporting roles in dramas Smooth Talker, Wudang Rules and  the highly rated Ghost of Relativity which brought her more public attention.

On 7 February 2022, Cheung announced on Instagram that her contract with TVB had ended.

Personal life
On July 31, 2016, Cheung announced on her social media account that she was engaged to her boyfriend Joe Choy. They held their wedding ceremony at the Intercontinental Hotel in Hong Kong on September 9, 2016.

Filmography

Television dramas

References

External links
TVB profile

Miss Hong Kong winners
Hong Kong beauty pageant winners
21st-century Hong Kong actresses
TVB actors
Actresses from Vancouver
Canadian people of Hong Kong descent
Canadian emigrants to Hong Kong
Living people
University of British Columbia alumni
1987 births